Carmen Romero Ferrer (born 6 October 1950) is a retired Cuban discus thrower. Her personal best throw was 69.08 metres, achieved in April 1976 in Havana.

Achievements

References

1950 births
Cuban female discus throwers
Cuban female shot putters
Athletes (track and field) at the 1971 Pan American Games
Athletes (track and field) at the 1975 Pan American Games
Athletes (track and field) at the 1976 Summer Olympics
Athletes (track and field) at the 1979 Pan American Games
Athletes (track and field) at the 1980 Summer Olympics
Olympic athletes of Cuba
Living people
Pan American Games medalists in athletics (track and field)
Pan American Games gold medalists for Cuba
Central American and Caribbean Games gold medalists for Cuba
Competitors at the 1966 Central American and Caribbean Games
Competitors at the 1970 Central American and Caribbean Games
Competitors at the 1974 Central American and Caribbean Games
Competitors at the 1978 Central American and Caribbean Games
Competitors at the 1982 Central American and Caribbean Games
Central American and Caribbean Games medalists in athletics
Medalists at the 1971 Pan American Games
Medalists at the 1975 Pan American Games
Medalists at the 1979 Pan American Games
20th-century Cuban women